Jerry Goldstein may refer to:

 Jerry Goldstein (physicist) (born 1970), space physicist
 Jerry Goldstein (producer), American producer, singer songwriter and musician